May Mahlangu (born 1 May 1989) is a South African professional footballer who plays as a central midfielder.

Club career

Early career
Mahlangu joined the Stars of Africa Academy at age 15 and played for their team Alexandra United FC.

Helsingborgs IF
Bo Nilsson was the manager of Allsvenskan club Helsingborgs IF in 2008 and through his connections with the academy he brought over Mahlangu to Sweden. Nilsson set it up so that Mahlangu would train with both Helsingborg and fourth tier club IFK Hässleholm each day, and that he would initially play league games for Hässleholm. After impressing in the Swedish lower leagues, Helsingborg decided to permanently make him a part of their squad in the summer of 2009. In 2011 the club won the Swedish league and Mahlangu was given the player of the year award.

IFK Göteborg
On 4 March 2014 Mahlangu joined Allsvenskan club IFK Göteborg on a one-year contract.

Konyaspor

May Mahlangu signed with Konyaspor in January 2015 as a free transfer. On 28 February 2015, Mahlangu scored his first league goal against Fenerbahçe.

Ludogorets Razgrad
Mahlangu signed a contract with Ludogorets Razgrad in August 2018, but saw limited action for the team.

Ordabasy
In 2019 he joined Ordabasy on loan before signing permanently with the Kazakh side in 2020.

International career
In January 2012, Mahlangu made his debut for the South Africa national team in a friendly against Equatorial Guinea. He was also included in South Africa's squad for the 2013 Africa Cup of Nations.

In November 2014, Mahlangu was banned from selection for the Bafana Bafana after failing to turn up for their 2015 Africa Cup of Nations qualifiers against Sudan and Nigeria, citing fatigue.

Career statistics

Club

International

Scores and results list South Africa's goal tally first, score column indicates score after each Mahlangu goal.

Honours
Helsingborgs IF
 Allsvenskan: 2011
 Svenska Cupen: 2010, 2011
 Svenska Supercupen: 2011, 2012

Dinamo Bucharest
 Cupa Ligii: 2016–17

Individual
 Allsvenskan Player of the Year: 2011

References

External links
 Profile at HelsingborgsIF.se  
 
 
 Profile at Eliteprospects.com 

1989 births
Living people
People from Govan Mbeki Local Municipality
South African soccer players
South Africa international soccer players
South African expatriate soccer players
South African expatriate sportspeople in Belgium
Expatriate footballers in Belgium
Expatriate footballers in Sweden
Expatriate footballers in Turkey
Expatriate footballers in Romania
Expatriate footballers in Bulgaria
Expatriate footballers in Kazakhstan
Association football midfielders
Helsingborgs IF players
IFK Hässleholm players
IFK Göteborg players
Konyaspor footballers
Sint-Truidense V.V. players
FC Dinamo București players
PFC Ludogorets Razgrad players
PFC Ludogorets Razgrad II players
FC Ordabasy players
Allsvenskan players
Division 2 (Swedish football) players
Süper Lig players
Belgian Pro League players
Liga I players
First Professional Football League (Bulgaria) players
Second Professional Football League (Bulgaria) players
Kazakhstan Premier League players
2013 Africa Cup of Nations players